Gloucestershire Parkway railway station is or was a proposed development in transport infrastructure for a semi-greenfield site surrounded by warehouse and light industry units  east of Gloucester city centre (including its main railway station) which is on a major east-west spur line off of the greater north-south Birmingham-to-Bristol line on which this station would be built.  The proposed site is specifically by an intra-city (urban) part of the inceptive A40 road in an area known as Elmbridge Court, Gloucester, England.

Specific proposal
If approved its 2006-submitted designs involve building:
an interchange for buses to Gloucester and Cheltenham accommodating a park and ride service
a 500-space car park.

In May 2007 the Department for Transport dismissed the above plans stating that several issues needed to be resolved. As of 2013 there has been no further development.

See also
Gloucester railway station
Cheltenham Spa railway station
Gloucestershire County Council bus transport services.

References

External links
 Gloucester Urban Regeneration

Buildings and structures in Gloucester
Proposed railway stations in England
Transport in Gloucester